Fort Stoddert, also known as Fort Stoddard, was a stockade fort in the U.S. Mississippi Territory, in what is today Alabama. It was located on a bluff of the Mobile River, near modern Mount Vernon, close to the confluence of the Tombigbee and Alabama Rivers. It served as the western terminus of the Federal Road which ran through Creek lands to Fort Wilkinson in Georgia. The fort, built in 1799, was named for Benjamin Stoddert, the secretary to the Continental Board of War during the American Revolution and Secretary of the Navy during the Quasi War. Fort Stoddert was built by the United States to keep the peace by preventing its own settlers in the Tombigbee District from attacking the Spanish in the Mobile District. It also served as a port of entry and was the site of a Court of Admiralty. While under the command of Captain Edmund P. Gaines, Aaron Burr was held as a prisoner at the fort after his arrest at McIntosh in 1807 for treason against the United States. In July 1813, General Ferdinand Claiborne brought the Mississippi Militia to Fort Stoddert as part of the Creek War. The 3rd Infantry Regiment was commanded by General Thomas Flournoy to Fort Stoddert following the Fort Mims massacre. The site declined rapidly in importance after the capture of Mobile by the United States in 1813 and the establishment of the Mount Vernon Arsenal in 1828.

A post office operated under the name Fort Stoddart from 1804 to 1829.

The first newspaper in Alabama, The Mobile Centinel, was published weekly at Fort Stoddert from 1811 to 1813.

References

Stoddert
Pre-statehood history of Alabama
Creek War
Buildings and structures in Mobile County, Alabama
Stoddert
Stoddert
Stoddert